Sabbineni Meghana (born 7 June 1996) is an Indian cricketer who currently plays for Railways and India. She plays primarily as a right-handed batter. She has previously played for Andhra and South Zone.

She was part of India's victorious team in the 2016 Women's Twenty20 Asia Cup. She was the leading run-scorer in the 2021–22 Women's Senior One Day Trophy, with 388 runs including one century and two half-centuries.

In January 2022, she was named as one of three reserve players in India's team for the 2022 Women's Cricket World Cup in New Zealand. She made her Women's One Day International (WODI) debut on 12 February 2022, for India against New Zealand.

In July 2022, she was named in India's team for the cricket tournament at the 2022 Commonwealth Games in Birmingham, England.

References

External links
 
 

1996 births
Living people
Cricketers from Andhra Pradesh
Sportswomen from Andhra Pradesh
India women One Day International cricketers
India women Twenty20 International cricketers
Andhra women cricketers
Railways women cricketers
South Zone women cricketers
IPL Trailblazers cricketers
Gujarat Giants (WPL) cricketers
Cricketers at the 2022 Commonwealth Games
Commonwealth Games silver medallists for India
Commonwealth Games medallists in cricket
Medallists at the 2022 Commonwealth Games